Octoman may refer to:

 Rudy Santos, a man from Philippines who bears an extra leg and four arms
 Dudley Octoman, an South Australian politician
 Octoman, a character in the video game F-Zero

See also
 Octaman, a 1971 monster film written and directed by Harry Essex